Mundia Khera is the village in the Rewari district of Haryana, India, approximately  from the city of Rewari. Mundia Khera Gram Panchayat is a relatively small village, comprising five wards and 800 voters .Late.SHRI LEELA RAM and his ancestors founded the village. kanwar singh and his wife are the longest serving sarpanch in the village  The village population is dominated by the Ahirs.There is an ancient temple of Baba Murli Nath and another temple of God Hanuman ji. Every year Mela of Baba Murli Nath is organized four days before Holi festival. This village is Nirmal village declared by Haryana Government and won nirmal gram award by president of India  for its cleanliness facilities available therein the village.

References

Villages in Rewari district